James Joseph Hartley (June 26, 1858 – January 12, 1944) was an American prelate of the Roman Catholic Church. He served as the fourth bishop of the Diocese of Columbus in Ohio from 1904 until his death over 39 years later.  His was the longest episcopate in the diocese's history.

Biography

Early life 
The eldest of six children, James Hartley was born on June 26, 1858, in Davenport, Iowa, to Irish immigrants Edward Hartley and Catherine McManus Hartley. Shortly after his birth, Hartley and his family moved to Columbus, Ohio, where his parents had been married at St. Patrick Parish.  His father kept a saloon on West Maple Street, and the family lived upstairs.  His father also worked as a Columbus police officer for many years.

Hartley attended the parish school at St. Patrick, then entered St. Aloysius Seminary in Columbus.  When that seminary closed, he attended Mount St. Mary's Seminary of the West in Norwood, Ohio, then Our Lady of Angels Seminary in Niagara, New York.

Priesthood 
Hartley was ordained to the priesthood for the Diocese of Columbus by Bishop John A. Watterson on July 10, 1882, in St. Joseph Cathedral in Columbus.  His first assignment was as assistant pastor at St. Peter's Parish in Steubenville, Ohio.  In 1885, he was named pastor of Holy Name Parish in Steubenville.  While pastor of Holy Name, Hartley organized a school, a high school, and had a new church built.  That church  became the cathedral of the Diocese of Steubenville when the diocese was erected by Pope Pius XII on October 21, 1944.

Bishop of Columbus 
On December 10, 1903, at the age of 45, Hartley was appointed as the fourth bishop of the Diocese of Columbus by Pope Pius X. He was consecrated by his predecessor Bishop Henry K. Moeller on February 25, 1904, in Holy Name Parish in Steubenville.  Bishops Denis O'Donaghue and Herman J. Alerding served as co-consecrators. Hartley was formally installed as bishop in St. Joseph Cathedral on March 1, 1904.

During his tenure, Hartley oversaw a significant growth of the diocese.  In 1905, he erected his first parishes, Holy Rosary and St. Aloysius. In 1906, he retired the debt on St. Joseph Cathedral.  Within the first five years of his episcopate, Hartley had begun or dedicated more than 25 churches, schools, and chapels.  He also renovated St. Joseph Cathedral.

Hartley establish the following institutions in Ohio:

 St. Charles Seminary in Columbus 
 St. Joseph Cemetery in Lockbourne
 St. Ann Hospital in Westerville
 Mercy Hospital in Portsmouth 
 Good Samaritan Hospital in Zanesville 
 Mercy Hospital in Mount Vernon
 St. Therese Shrine in Columbus

Toward the end of his term as bishop, Hartley consecrated Reverend Edward Hettinger as the first auxiliary bishop of the diocese.

Death and legacy 

James Hartley died in Columbus on January 12, 1944, at age 85.  He was buried at St. Joseph Cemetery in Lockbourne, Ohio. Bishop Hartley High School, established on the east side of Columbus in 1957, is named in his honor.

Footnotes

1858 births
1944 deaths
American people of Irish descent
People from Davenport, Iowa
Roman Catholic bishops of Columbus
20th-century Roman Catholic bishops in the United States
The Athenaeum of Ohio alumni
Catholics from Iowa